Koukou may refer to:

People
 Emperor Kōkō (830–887), 58th emperor of Japan
 George Koukou (born 1945), Liberian politician
 Djiman Koukou (born 1990), Beninese footballer

Places
 Kuku, Algeria
 Kingdom of Kuku, a medieval Berber kingdom
 Koukou, Togo
 Koukou Angarana, Chad

See also
 Koko (disambiguation)
 Kuku (disambiguation)